Men's Downhill World Cup 1980/1981

Calendar

Final point standings

In Men's Downhill World Cup 1980/81 the best 5 results count.

Men's Downhill Team Results

All points were shown including individuel deduction. bold indicate highest score - italics indicate race wins

References
 fis-ski.com

External links
 

World Cup
FIS Alpine Ski World Cup men's downhill discipline titles